Janet Howard Darbyshire, CBE FMedSci is a British epidemiologist and science administrator.

Career
Darbyshire joined the Medical Research Council (MRC) in 1974, first co-ordinating clinical trials and epidemiological studies of tuberculosis, asthma and other respiratory diseases in the UK and East Africa for the MRC Tuberculosis and Chest Diseases Unit. She became the head of the MRC HIV Clinical Trials Centre when it was founded in 1989, designing and co-ordinating multi-centre trials of therapeutics for people with HIV, as well as vaccines and microbicides to prevent infection.

In 1980, Darbyshire was awarded an MSc by the London School of Hygiene and Tropical Medicine.

In 1998, she became head of the new MRC Clinical Trials Unit, established as a centre of excellence for clinical trials, meta-analyses and epidemiological studies in HIV, cancer and other diseases. She is also co-director of the UK Clinical Research Network (UKCRN). As of 2013, she is on the board of the Lister Institute of Preventive Medicine and the Society for Clinical Trials.

Awards and honours
Darbyshire is a fellow of the Academy of Medical Sciences, the Royal College of Physicians and the Society for Clinical Trials. 

Already an Officer of the Order of the British Empire (OBE), she was elevated to Commander of the Order of the British Empire (CBE) in the 2010 New Year Honours for "services to Clinical Science". 

In 2018, Darbyshire was awarded the MRC Millenium Medal for her "world-leading research on clinical trials and epidemiology has prevented disease and saved lives across the world".

References

External links
 Academy of Medical Sciences interview
 

British public health doctors
British medical researchers
British women medical doctors
Commanders of the Order of the British Empire
Fellows of the Academy of Medical Sciences (United Kingdom)
Fellows of the Royal College of Physicians
Living people
20th-century British women scientists
21st-century British women scientists
Women epidemiologists
Year of birth missing (living people)
Women public health doctors